"Red Frame/White Light" is the second single by English electronic band Orchestral Manoeuvres in the Dark (OMD). The song is about a red telephone box in Meols, on the Wirral peninsula in Cheshire, that was used by the group to make calls to organise their gigs in the late 1970s. The track is composed of two alternating major/minor sections, each built around a synthesizer hook. Lyrical content is minimal, comprising mostly brief, spoken word utterances. It was the band's first single to chart.

The song had previously never been included in any of the group's compilation albums (except for the promo video being included on the DVD of Messages - OMD Greatest Hits in 2008) until 2019, when it appeared as part of Souvenir: The Singles Collection 1979-2019.

Reception
Simon Ludgate of Record Mirror described the song as "a fab record to dance to" and "irresistibly catchy". Melody Maker called it "synth-pop of the new sensibility, which incorporates humour, emotion and a healthy awareness of disposability." Other appraisals were mixed, making unfavourable comparisons to Gary Numan, or suggesting that it was not the best album track to be chosen as a single.

Retrospectively, AllMusic critic Ned Raggett praised the song's "mysterious chimes and spy-movie dramatics", while John Doran in The Quietus described the track as "awesome".

The Human League frontman Philip Oakey described "Red Frame/White Light" as a "personal favourite" that cemented his fandom of OMD.

Track listing
 "Red Frame/White Light" – 3:15
 "I Betray My Friends" – 3:50

Sleeve design
The sleeve was designed by Ben Kelly and Peter Saville.

Telephone box

The telephone box that inspired "Red Frame/White Light" is located at the junction of Birkenhead Road and Greenwood Road in Meols.

In the nearby pub "The Railway Inn" the band would meet and used the telephone box to organise their gigs and transportation. In the song's lyrics the phone number is mentioned: 6323003.

Fans would ring the number expecting to get one of the band members, but got a confused home owner in their own area code. Over the years it has become a kind of sacred place for OMD fans.

On the evening of 18 August 2017 the phone box was removed by BT Group. It has subsequently been restored and returned to its original location as of October 2017.

Music video
Russell Mulcahy shot the video. It was believed to have been lost as it was not part of Virgin's video archive. Keyboardist Paul Humphreys sourced a copy which led to its inclusion on the DVD component of Messages: Greatest Hits (2008). The Roland CR-78 drum machine, which was used on the intro of the song, is visible in the clip.

Charts
"Red Frame/White Light" was the group's first entry on the UK Singles Chart, reaching number 67 in February 1980. 
{| class="wikitable sortable plainrowheaders" style="text-align:center"
|-
! scope="col"| Chart (1980)
! scope="col"| Peakposition
|-

|-
! scope="row"| US Dance Club Songs (Billboard){{small|with "Messages"}}
| 67
|}

Alternative versions
Contrary to identical timings being printed on the 7" and 12" labels, the 12" version is slightly longer as the coda comes to a sudden stop, as opposed to the 7" version which fades out.

The group recorded a version of "Red Frame/White Light" for a John Peel radio session in 1979. This version was made available on the Peel Sessions 1979–1983 album release (2000).

A Remastered Version appeared on the 2019 compilation album and box-set, Souvenir: The Singles Collection 1979-2019.

Live performances
After being included in many early live sets, the song has rarely been performed live by the band after 1980.

A live performance was recorded at the Theatre Royal, Nottingham on 28 July 1980 for Rockstage TV broadcast. It was not given official release until 2015 on the Access All Areas CD and DVD release.

In 2019, the band performed the song as an encore on their 40th anniversary Souvenir Tour''.

References

1980 singles
Orchestral Manoeuvres in the Dark songs
Songs written by Andy McCluskey
Electronic songs
1980 songs
Songs written by Paul Humphreys